Michael John Gething (born 12 August 1967) is an Australian judge of the District Court of Western Australia since 12 February 2016. In 2014, Gething served as the Principal Registrar and Acting Master of the Supreme Court of Western Australia . Prior to this he served as the Principal Registrar of the District Court of Western Australia.

Early life 
Gething read law at the University of Western Australia. He gained admittance to practice law in 1991.

References

1967 births
Living people
20th-century Australian lawyers
University of Western Australia alumni
21st-century Australian judges